Eads Creek is a stream in Wayne County in the U.S. state of Missouri. It is a tributary of the Black River.

Eads Creek has the name of Jack Eads, an early citizen.

See also
List of rivers of Missouri

References

Rivers of Wayne County, Missouri
Rivers of Missouri
Tributaries of the Black River (Arkansas–Missouri)